Wyoming Highway 150 (WYO 150) is a  north–south Wyoming State Road that runs from the Wyoming–Utah state border to north to Evanston. It is the Wyoming portion of the Mirror Lake Scenic Byway.

Route description

Wyoming Highway 150 is the continuation of Utah State Route 150 along the Mirror Lake Scenic Byway. WYO 150 travels north toward Evanston, passing through the community of Beartown and west of Sulphur Springs Reservoir. Highway 150 enters Evanston from the south, passing the Wyoming State Hospital before reaching its northern end at an interchange shared with the southern terminus of Wyoming Highway 89 at exit 5 of Interstate 80/US Route 189. Wyoming Highway 89 takes over as the roadway north of I-80/US 189.

The Mirror Lake Scenic Byway over the Uinta Mountains in Utah is closed during the winter. However, Wyoming Highway 150 remains open except during harsh conditions. Wyoming 150 follows State Control Route 2100 for its entire length.

Major intersections

See also

References

External links 

Wyoming State Routes 100-199
WYO 150 - UT 150/Utah State Line to I-80/US 189/WYO 89

Transportation in Uinta County, Wyoming
150